Södertälje Rugbyklubb is a Rugby union team in Södertälje. They currently play in Allsvenskan North.

History
The club was founded on 17 December 1968.

SM-Guld: 7's 2015, 2018
SM-silver: 7's 2016, 2017

External links
Södertälje Rugbyklubb

Swedish rugby union teams
Sport in Södertälje
Rugby clubs established in 1968
1968 establishments in Sweden